Bob Junior (born 1986) is a Tanzanian Bongo Flava musician. He owns his own studio called Sharobaro Records.

He has been twice nominated for the Tanzania Music Awards, once in 2011 for Best Upcoming Artist and in 2012 for Best Male Artist.

References

External links

 
 
 

 Living people
 People from Iringa Region
 1986 births
 21st-century Tanzanian male singers
 Tanzanian hip hop musicians
 Swahili-language singers
Tanzanian Bongo Flava musicians

Tanzanian male actors